Gonzalo Delgrás (1897–1984) was a Spanish screenwriter and film director.

Selected filmography
 The Complete Idiot (1939)
 The Hired Husband (1942)
 Cristina Guzmán (1943)
 Gold and Ivory (1947)
 Under the Skies of the Asturias (1951)
 Juan Simón's Daughter (1957)

References

Bibliography
 Mira, Alberto. The A to Z of Spanish Cinema. Scarecrow Press, 2010.

External links

1897 births
1984 deaths
Spanish male screenwriters
Spanish film directors
People from Barcelona
20th-century Spanish screenwriters
20th-century Spanish male writers